German Coast Parish, Orleans Territory was a former parish (county) of Louisiana that existed from April 10, 1805, until April 14, 1807, during the U.S. territorial, pre-statehood period. Much of the parish comprises present-day St. John the Baptist Parish.

See also 
 German Coast

Former counties of the United States
1805 establishments in the Territory of Orleans
1807 disestablishments in the United States
Geography of Louisiana